Rodrigo Araújo da Silva Filho (born 17 April 2001), commonly known as Rodriguinho, is a Brazilian footballer who plays as a forward for Chapecoense.

Club career
Born in Belo Horizonte, Minas Gerais, Rodriguinho joined Atlético Mineiro's youth setup at the age of ten. He left the club in 2019 to join Avaí, and moved to Chapecoense ahead of the 2021 season.

After impressing with the under-20s, Rodriguinho made his first team – and Série A – debut on 3 October 2021, coming on as a half-time substitute for Anselmo Ramon in a 1–1 home draw against São Paulo. He scored his first professional goal thirteen days later, netting the equalizer in a 1–2 home loss against Fortaleza.

Career statistics

References

External links
Chapecoense profile 

2001 births
Living people
Footballers from Belo Horizonte
Brazilian footballers
Association football forwards
Campeonato Brasileiro Série A players
Associação Chapecoense de Futebol players